Computer Science and Engineering (CSE) is an academic program at many universities which comprises scientific and engineering aspects of computing. CSE is also a term often used in Europe to translate the name of engineering informatics academic programs. It is offered in both Undergraduate as well Postgraduate with specializations.

Academic courses 
Academic programs vary between colleges, but typically include a combination of topics in computer science, computer engineering, and electrical engineering. Undergraduate courses usually include programming, algorithms and data structures, computer architecture, operating systems, computer networks, parallel computing, embedded systems, algorithms design, circuit analysis and electronics, digital logic and processor design, computer graphics, scientific computing, software engineering, database systems, digital signal processing, virtualization, computer simulations and games programming. CSE programs also include core subjects of theoretical computer science such as theory of computation, numerical methods, machine learning, programming theory and paradigms. Modern academic programs also cover emerging computing fields like image processing, data science, robotics, bio-inspired computing, computational biology, autonomic computing and artificial intelligence. Most CSE programs require introductory mathematical knowledge, hence the first year of study is dominated by mathematical courses, primarily discrete mathematics, mathematical analysis, linear algebra, probability, and statistics, as well as the basics of electrical and electronic engineering, physics, and electromagnetism.

Example universities with CSE majors and departments 
 American International University-Bangladesh
 American University of Beirut
 Amrita Vishwa Vidyapeetham
 Bangladesh University of Engineering and Technology
 Brainware University
 Bucknell University
 Delft University of Technology
 Indian Institute of Technology Kanpur
 Indian Institute of Technology Bombay
 Indian Institute of Technology Delhi
 Indian Institute of Technology Madras
 Lund University
 Massachusetts Institute of Technology
 North South University
 Ohio State University
 Santa Clara University
 Seoul National University
 UC Davis
 UC Irvine
 UCLA
 UC Merced
 UC San Diego
 UC Santa Cruz
 University of Iowa
 University of Michigan
 University of New South Wales
 University of Nevada
 University of Notre Dame
 University of Ulm
 University of Washington
 Shahid Beheshti University

See also 
 Computer science
 Computer engineering
 Computer graphics (computer science)
 Bachelor of Technology

References 

Computer science education
Computer engineering
Engineering academics
Engineering education